Alessandro Faiolhe Amantino (born 1 August 1980 in Ipatinga, Brazil), more commonly known as Mancini, is a Brazilian football coach and former player.

Mancini started his career playing as a right-back for Atlético Mineiro in 1999. After moving to Italy in 2003, he was converted into an attacking player. During his time with A.S. Roma, Mancini was famed for his dribbling skills and use of feints, especially his step-overs, playing mainly as a winger on either flank, and occasionally as a second striker and an attacking midfielder. At international level, he made nine appearances for Brazil between 2004 and 2008, and was a member of the squad that won the 2004 Copa América.

Club career

Early career
Regarded as a promising talent, Mancini began his career in his homeland of Brazil with his hometown club, Atlético Mineiro, where he remained from 1999 to 2002. During that time he had two loan spells, at Portuguesa and at São Caetano in 2001.

Venezia
He was signed by Serie B side AC Venezia in January 2003. During that time he struggled to adapt to Italian football, and was criticised by the Venezia manager for his errors, and for his habit of controlling the ball with the outside of his foot, which in Italy is considered unconventional.

Mancini only made 13 appearances for Venezia that season. In the summer of 2003 he was signed by A.S. Roma for nominal fees totalling €1,000.

Roma
Having lost Cafu, Roma needed a replacement at right-back, but with his early performances in Italy being far from convincing, many Roma fans were sceptical about his ability. However, their then-manager Fabio Capello gave the Brazilian a chance, and Mancini went on to complete a consistent first season in Serie A, the highlight being a backheel flick from a set piece in the Derby della Capitale against S.S. Lazio.

In the 2005–06 season, Mancini began to find his top form, once again becoming a key player for the Roma side. Following the Calciopoli scandal, Roma qualified for the UEFA Champions League, giving Mancini the chance to play at the highest level of club football.

In the last 16 of the 2006–07 UEFA Champions League, Mancini scored a goal against Lyon after beating their defender Anthony Réveillère with several stepovers before firing the ball high into the net. That same year, Mancini also celebrated his first silverware since arriving in Italy as Roma won the Coppa Italia, beating Internazionale in the final.

In the 2007–08 season, Mancini scored eight league goals as Roma reached the quarter-finals of the Champions League and finished as runners-up in Serie A for the second year running. He did not have the best of seasons though, in what would prove to be his last in Rome.

Internazionale 

After the appointment of José Mourinho, Mancini was signed by Internazionale for €13 million, along with Ricardo Quaresma and Sulley Muntari in his maiden season. (Although Mancini was a long desired target of Massimo Moratti and ex-coach Roberto Mancini). However, he failed to become a first team regular due to his lack of consistency.

Milan 

On 1 February 2010, he moved to city rivals A.C. Milan, on loan for the remainder of the 2009–10 season, with an option for them to acquire half of the player's rights at the end of the loan spell. He made his debut for Milan in a scoreless draw against Bologna.

Return to Brazil 
He returned to Atlético Mineiro on 5 January 2011, signing a three-year contract.

In June 2012, Mancini joined Esporte Clube Bahia. He played for the team until the end of the year.

After spending 2013 as a free agent, in January 2014 Mancini signed with Villa Nova for their Minas Gerais state league campaign. He scored seven goals, making him the top-scorer of the league.

At the end of the state league season, Mancini signed a contract with Série B team América until December 2014.

In January 2016, the Villa Nova-MG agreed to hire Mancini for the next season.

Managerial career
On 7 August 2019, Mancini signed his first manager contract with Serie D club Foggia.

His short-lived experience as Foggia boss ended 2 September 2019, as he resigned after the first league game, a 0–1 away loss to Fasano.

On 1 September 2020, Mancini took over as the new head coach of Brazilian club Villa Nova. He was successively sacked on 8 October 2020, only to be reinstated the next day. He left the club by the end of the 2020 Campeonato Brasileiro Série D season.

Personal life

Name and background
His surname is, in the Iberian fashion, a composite of his parents' principal surnames. Portuguese naming customs most commonly have the mother's surname first, preceding the father's (in contrast to the traditional order usual in Spanish names). Mancini's follows the usual Portuguese order: The first surname element, Faiolhe, is a variant spelling of Faioli; the second surname component is Amantino. Mancini holds Italian nationality through descent, via his great-grandmother Genoveffa from Veneto.

2011 rape conviction
In 2011 Mancini was investigated for rape, as a result of an allegation by a Brazilian woman, following an incident at a party held by Ronaldinho in December 2010. On 28 November 2011, he was convicted and sentenced to 2 years and 8 months after being found guilty of rape by the court of Milan.

Career statistics

Club

International

Honours

Club
Roma
Coppa Italia: 2006–07, 2007–08
Supercoppa Italiana: 2007

Internazionale
Serie A: 2008–09
Supercoppa Italiana: 2008

International
Brazil
Copa América: 2004

References

External links

Profile at La Gazzetta dello Sport (2009–10) 
  
 Profile at AIC.Football.it 
 
 

1980 births
Living people
People from Ipatinga
Sportspeople from Minas Gerais
Brazilian people convicted of rape
Brazilian footballers
Brazilian football managers
Brazil international footballers
Brazil under-20 international footballers
Brazilian expatriate footballers
Brazilian expatriate sportspeople in Italy
Brazilian people of Italian descent
Citizens of Italy through descent
Expatriate footballers in Italy
Association football wingers
2004 Copa América players
A.C. Milan players
A.S. Roma players
América Futebol Clube (MG) players
Associação Desportiva São Caetano players
Associação Portuguesa de Desportos players
Calcio Foggia 1920 managers
Campeonato Brasileiro Série A players
Clube Atlético Mineiro players
Copa América-winning players
Esporte Clube Bahia players
Inter Milan players
Serie A players
Serie B players
Serie D managers
Venezia F.C. players
Villa Nova Atlético Clube managers
Villa Nova Atlético Clube players